Luohan quan, which means "Arhat fist", is a general name for all the styles of Chinese martial arts that are named after the Arhats, the holy Buddhist figures. Luohan style is the oldest and the representative style of Shaolin Kung Fu. The original roots of Luohan style date back to the early eras of Shaolin temple. In Shaolin temple, there are various Luohan styles. Besides the Shaolin Luohan styles, there are many Luohan-related styles that have been developed in many other areas of China. Shaolin Luohan 18 hands and Luohan quan are always praised as the root styles based on which most of the Shaolin kung fu styles and many other non-Shaolin styles have been created.

Luohan and Shaolin
Enlightenment (Nirvana) is one of the first concepts of Buddhism. The name Luohan, the Chinese equivalent of the Sanskrit (Indian) word Arhat, refers to those who have achieved enlightenment. Therefore, the ultimate goal of the monks of Shaolin temple, in particular, has always been to reach the level of becoming Luohans. Therefore, the Luohan(s) have always been holy icon(s) in the daily life and martial art of Shaolin temple monks. As far as related to Shaolin temple martial arts, the names Luohan quan and Shaolin quan are often considered synonyms and therefore interchangeable.

Luohan's 18 hands
There are various Luohan's 18 hands styles. These are the most important ones:

Shaolin Luohan's 18 hands
A myth states that Bodhidharma, while visiting the Shaolin Temple taught the monks a series of exercises. Whether this story is right or wrong, based on Buddhist teachings, by observing and imitating the forms and expressions of Arhat statues in the temple, meditation and practice, those ancient exercises later evolved into a combat form called "18 hands of Luohan", which is the oldest documented, systematized style of Shaolin Kung Fu. According to the historical official text of Shaolin temple, "Shaolin Kung fu Manual", in the Sui dynasty (581-618 AD) Shaolin monks had a selected set of 18 simple movements; until the Tang dynasty (618-907 AD) the set had developed into 18 martial postures, that were combined into a form; the number of the postures increased to 36 until the early Song dynasty (960 AD); and in the Jin-Yuan dynasty (1115-1368 AD) it was developed into 173 movements; finally, in the Ming dynasty the system of the 18 hands of Luohan was completed in 18 forms, each form having 18 postures, making a total of 324 postures. In Shaolin, this style is called "inborn Luohan's 18 hands", because it was the style with which Shaolin kung fu was born. Monk Shi Deqian, in his efforts to document Shaolin martial arts collected 8 forms of the 18 hands of Luohan into his "Encyclopedia of Shaolin martial arts". Of these forms, most lineages of Shaolin monks have mostly kept only one form, mostly the first, or the eighth form. Shaolin Luohan's 18 hands movements are simple and straight. The methods are mostly done by the palms of the hands. Fists, hook hands, and other hand gestures and kicks are less used. Luohan's 18 hands are considered the elementary forms in Shaolin kung fu.

Shaolin/Hua quan Luohan's 18 hands
There is another Luohan's 18 hands style which is different from the original Shaolin Luohan's 18 hands but is more famous. This Luohan's 18 hands style has 18 different methods, consisted of 6 different methods of fist,  1 method of elbow, 2 methods of palm, 4 methods of leg, and 5 methods of joint locking. Of these 18 methods, a form of 24 movements for attack and defense is developed, which can be performed as a solo form or as a duet form. This style is originally from the Hua quan style of Shandong province, was brought to the Louyang area of Henan Province (close to Shaolin Temple) and was later adopted into the Shaolin curriculum, along with its sister set Ba Bu Lian Huan Quan.

Shaolin Guard the Mountain of Child Gate Luohan's 18 hands
Guard the Mountain of Child Gate Luohan's 18 hands is a less known Luohan's 18 hands style. This style has 32 movements, which in total make 18 postures.

Shaolin Luohan's 18 hands of Dengfeng area
There is another less known Luohan's 18 hands style that has been passed down by Li Gensheng, a famous master from Dengfeng county near Shaolin. The 18 movements of this style are very similar to the first form of one version of Shaolin 18 Luohan quan. These kinds of movements are also used in the Tong Bi quan style of the western courtyard of Shaolin temple.

Luohan quan
There are various Luohan quan styles. These are the most important ones:

Shaolin Luohan quan
Luohan quan is considered a completely pure Buddhist Shaolin style. It is the most famous, and of the most important styles of Shaolin kung fu. Shaolin monks developed Luohan quan as an advanced style based on the 18 hands of Luohan. Luohan quan has been created in the early ages of Shaolin temple, but it was first officially documented by Shaolin monks in the "Shaolin Kung Fu Manual" in the early years of the Song dynasty in 960s AD. This style has two forms called small and big Luohan quan, which are considered the oldest excellent styles of Shaolin temple.
Small Luohan quan has 27 postures/36 movements and big Luohan quan has about 36 postures/54 movements. Big Luohan quan is traditionally called "golden child small Luohan quan".

Shaolin small and big Luohan quans are also practiced by the folk people of Dengfeng area around Shaolin in a less Luohan-imitative version, which drops out or simplifies the Luohan-imitating postures of the original Shaolin Luohan quan. They have extended the big Luohan quan with an additional part to make it 3 parts.  Shi Deyang, 31st generation Shaolin monk talks about 6 forms of big Luohan quan, but most people only know these 3 parts.

Shaolin Luohan quan movements, though simple, are highly advanced and deceptive. Attack and defense are masked by Luohan Buddhist postures and come out from unlikely angles.

Shaolin 18 Luohan quan
During the centuries, Luohan quan was developed. A major contribution was by monk Jue Yuan and two others named Li Sou and Bai Yufeng. Finally, as a result of the developments since the Jin and Yuan dynasties until the middle and late Ming dynasty, a Luohan quan system of 18 forms was created, one form for each one of the famous Luohans, which at those times had increased in number to 18 in Chan Buddhism. In this style, each Luohan form is divided into 3 sections, so it has 54 sections in total. This style is less imitative than small&big Luohan quan style and has given up or, at least, transformed many of the famous Luohan-imitating postures. 18 Luohan quan, though very famous, is rarely known. Even inside Shaolin, only a few people in each generation inherit this style completely. There are different versions of 18 Luohan quan. One version has 18 forms for the 18 Luohans, while there are other versions with 9 long forms which altogether represent 18 Luohan characters. As an estimation of the diversity, just notice that Shaolin monk Shi Degen (1914-1970) taught 3 seemingly different versions to 3 of his disciples, Liu Zhenhai, Shi Yongwen, and Zhu Tianxi.

Shaolin Luohan's 108 methods of combat
The "108 combat methods of Arhat" is a set of 108 fighting methods of hitting and grappling (throwing, locking, and take-downs), which have been created and developed by Shaolin monks of various generations. There are also a few smaller and a bigger such set of "360 combat methods of Arhat" in Shaolin.

Other Luohan styles
There is a famous saying, "all martial arts under heaven originated from Shaolin," and all styles at Shaolin originated from Luohan 18 hands and Luohan quan. Because of the historical and technical effects of Shaolin temple on other styles, Luohan styles of Shaolin are the roots of many many other styles. There are many styles with the name Luohan quan created and developed outside of Shaolin temple: In Henan province which Shaolin temple is located, there are several Luohan quans. In the nearby provinces of Hebei and Shandong, in the southern provinces of Zhejiang and Fujian, and the southwestern province of Sichuan, where Emei mountain is located, and also in south China sea area there are many different Luohan styles. For example, in Fujian there are more than 5 different Luohan quans recognized. The Luohan's 18 hands style of Hua quan from Shandong province is also very famous, so that it is even practiced by some lineages of Shaolin monks. Some of these Luohan styles have over exaggerated Luohan imitating tastes, while some do not have any Luohan-looking characteristics.

References

Chinese martial arts
Buddhist martial arts